M. Gray Murray (1871 – 10 February 1937) was a British actor of the silent era.

Selected filmography
 Jobson's Luck (1913)
 The Lure of London (1914)
 The Troubles of an Heiress (1914)
 The Loss of the Birkenhead (1914)
 The Life of Shakespeare (1914)
 Her Luck in London (1914)
 Florence Nightingale (1915)
 Home (1915)
 The World's Desire (1915)
 The Four Feathers (1921)
 A Woman of No Importance (1921)
 Sonia (1921)
 The Place of Honour (1921)
 Married Life (1921)
 The Taming of the Shrew (1923)

References

External links
 

1871 births
1937 deaths
English male silent film actors
Male actors from London
20th-century British male actors